Orvar Stambert (born 30 September 1960) is a retired Swedish ice hockey player. Stambert was part of the Djurgården Swedish champions' team of 1989, 1990, and 1991. Stambert made 323 Elitserien appearances for Djurgården.

References

External links

1960 births
Buffalo Sabres draft picks
Djurgårdens IF Hockey players
Hammarby Hockey (1921–2008) players
Living people
Swedish ice hockey defencemen